The Battle of Carlisle was an American Civil War skirmish fought in Pennsylvania on the same day as the Battle of Gettysburg, First Day.  Stuart's Confederate cavalry briefly engaged Union militia under Maj. Gen. William F. "Baldy" Smith at Carlisle and set fire to the Carlisle Barracks.  Stuart's cavalry withdrew and arrived at the Battle of Gettysburg, Second Day, to the annoyance and concern of Gen. Robert E. Lee.

Background
After Carlisle was settled in 1751, the Carlisle Barracks military post was established nearby in 1757 and had an antebellum United States Army Cavalry School (e.g., Captain Stoneman's four companies had a Civil War encampment at Horner's Mill on May 6, 1861.)  By June 1863 the barrack's cavalry had been "withdrawn to Harrisburg".

On June 27, 1863, Confederate Lt. Gen. Richard S. Ewell's Second Corps of the Army of Northern Virginia stopped at Carlisle en route to Harrisburg and requisitioned supplies, forage, and food from the populace. Ewell, as well as some of his officers, had been stationed at the Carlisle Barracks prior to the Civil War when they were still members of the United States Army. He paused in Carlisle while sending his cavalry under Brig. Gen. Albert G. Jenkins towards the Susquehanna River and Harrisburg. After resting much of his infantry overnight, Ewell moved northward in his quest to seize the state capital.

After the Confederates left in response to an order from Lee to concentrate near Gettysburg, Carlisle was reoccupied by Baldy Smith and a small contingent of New York and Pennsylvania militia from the Department of the Susquehanna, dispatched by the department commander, Maj. Gen. Darius N. Couch. The 32nd and 33rd Pennsylvania Volunteer Militia, Landis's Philadelphia militia artillery battery, and a company of the 1st New York Cavalry formed Smith's force.

Stuart's raid
During the early evening of July 1, Stuart led two brigades of cavalry, at the end of their raid into Maryland and Pennsylvania, to Carlisle to look for supplies and to attempt to ascertain the whereabouts of Ewell's troops. A third brigade, under Wade Hampton, remained behind in York County to guard a train of 125 captured Federal supply wagons. Instead of finding Ewell, Stuart encountered Smith's militiamen.  Despite having a large numerical advantage, Stuart's troopers were too exhausted from a month of campaigning to attack the town outright, and Stuart initially feared that the enemy troops were veterans from the Army of the Potomac.

After learning that Smith's men were only militia, Stuart sent Maj. Gen. Fitzhugh Lee into Carlisle with a white flag, telling Smith to either evacuate the town or clear out the women and children.  Smith replied that he had already done the latter, and refused to surrender.  Stuart's horse artillery under Captain James Breathed then began bombarding the town.  After shelling Carlisle for several hours, Stuart received word that fighting had broken out to the southwest at Gettysburg between the main armies.  Unable to take the town by force, Stuart disengaged, having ordered his troops to set on fire the Carlisle Barracks.  Stuart's troops started moving towards the fighting at Gettysburg about 1:00 am on July 2, 1863.

In addition to minimal Union and Confederate casualties, a lumber yard and the town gas works were destroyed after being set fire. However, Stuart's delay at Carlisle impacted his ability to rendezvous with Lee's main army.

References

External links
 The Shelling of Carlisle

Carlisle, Pennsylvania
Carlisle
Carlisle
Carlisle
Carlisle
Carlisle
History of Cumberland County, Pennsylvania
1863 in Pennsylvania
July 1863 events